Lavell may refer to:

People
 LaVell Edwards (1930–2016), American football coach
 LaVell Boyd (born 1976), American football player
 Lavell Crawford (born 1968), American comedian
 Lavell, American singer (Baton Rouge, La)
 David Banner (né Lavell Crump, born 1974), American musician

Businesses
 Lavells Newsagents Ltd, a former British retail chain

Places
 Lavell Township, Minnesota, USA